Cristian Damián Lillo (born 12 August 1985) is an Argentine professional footballer who plays as a midfielder for Deportivo Morón.

Career
Lillo, after spending his youth at Alianza Sociedad de Fomento, started in 2004 with Estudiantes, where he remained for three seasons. In 2008, Lillo had a stint with Ferro Carril Oeste, appearing twenty-five times before rejoining Estudiantes in January 2009. In June 2010, Lillo joined Primera B Metropolitana team Platense. One goal, versus Almagro, in twenty-seven matches followed. After spending 2011–12 with Defensores de Belgrano, Lillo moved to Mexico by signing with Ascenso MX's Altamira. His debut came on 22 July 2012 against Toros Neza, which preceded his first goal in a Copa MX win over Atlas days later.

Lillo sealed a move back to Argentina on 18 December 2012 after joining Flandria. He spent two seasons back with the Primera B Metropolitana club, with the second ending with relegation to Primera C Metropolitana. Lillo subsequently remained in the third tier after he signed for Deportivo Morón. Having scored five goals in one hundred and seven games in all competitions, he made his first appearance in Primera B Nacional versus Los Andes after they won promotion as champions in 2016–17.

Personal life
In 2017, Lillo became president of former youth club Alianza Sociedad de Fomento; having previously been vice president, he had also joined the board of directors at the age of eighteen.

Career statistics
.

Honours
Deportivo Morón
Primera B Metropolitana: 2016–17

References

External links

1985 births
Living people
People from Tres de Febrero Partido
Argentine footballers
Association football midfielders
Argentine expatriate footballers
Expatriate footballers in Mexico
Argentine expatriate sportspeople in Mexico
Primera B Metropolitana players
Primera Nacional players
Ascenso MX players
Estudiantes de Buenos Aires footballers
Ferro Carril Oeste footballers
Club Atlético Platense footballers
Defensores de Belgrano footballers
Altamira F.C. players
Flandria footballers
Deportivo Morón footballers
Sportspeople from Buenos Aires Province